St. Andrew's Scots Church, sometimes known as the Church of Scotland, is a 19th-century church in Valletta, Malta. The church was built to the neo-gothic design of Maltese architect Giuseppe Bonavia. It is still an active church today, as a joint congregation of the Church of Scotland, as part of the Presbytery of Europe, and the British Methodist Church South-East District.

History

Casa Torrensi
The site was previously occupied by Casa Torrensi, built during the Order of St. John in the 17th-century, and carried the address number of 60. The site is located in the proximity of the Demandolx townhouses, of which two from three survived the war. The remaining two are today occupied by the Ministry of Finance.

The church
The site was bought by Reverend John Keeling in 1824 in order to build the first non-Catholic church in Malta. It is the first Neo-Gothic building on the Maltese islands. Initially the church was built for the Methodist community, only to be later acquired by the Church of Scotland and used by the Presbyterian community. Since the turn of the 20th-century it has a mixed congregation that includes presbyterians, methodists, other protestants/reformists and some Catholics.

The church was built in 1857 by Reverend Dr. George Wisely. He ministered a small methodist congregation from the year it was built till 1896.

It was the first neo-gothic church to be built in Malta, on the designs of Maltese architect Giuseppe Bonavia.

Wiseley was minister of St Andrew's and Presbyterian Chaplain to the Forces in Malta from 1854 to 1914. The current minister is Rev. Beata Thane from Church of Scotland. Previous Ministers were Rev. Kim Hurst from the Methodist Church, Rev. Doug McRoberts, a Church of Scotland minister, who succeeded Methodist Rev David Morris, who in 2002 had followed Rev Colin Westmarland (from 1975 onwards) who had been the first minister not to be a UK military chaplain.

Further reading
British Temperance Reformers and the Island of Malta (1815-1814)
British PM urged to learn from Church of Scotland project helping migrants in Malta. 24 August 2015. Times of Malta. Retrieved 11 April 2016.
Foodbank’s future at risk. 28 March 2015. Times of Malta. Retrieved 17 May 2016.
Anzac experience in Malta. p. 6.

See also

Culture of Malta
History of Malta
List of Churches in Malta
Religion in Malta

References

External links

1824 establishments in Malta
Religious organizations established in 1824
Church of Scotland churches
Methodist church buildings in Europe
Buildings and structures in Valletta
Presbyterian churches in Europe
Gothic Revival church buildings in Malta